Pongtiku Airport  is a defunct airport in Rantetayo, Tana Toraja Regency, Province South Sulawesi, Indonesia. It had a 1,300 meter runway and was served by ATR 42 and Fokker 50 aircraft. The airport was closed on 4 September 2020 with the opening of the Buntu Kunik Airport.

Airlines and destinations

References

Airports in South Sulawesi